Fischamend is a town in the district of Bruck an der Leitha in the Austrian state of Lower Austria. It belonged to Wien-Umgebung District which was dissolved in 2016.

Population

Geography 
Fischamend lies in the "Industrial Quarter" in Lower Austria.

References

Cities and towns in Bruck an der Leitha District